Scelimena is a genus of ground hoppers, with records from India, Indo-China, Malesia and PNG, belonging to the Tetrigidae family of Orthopterans.

Species 
The Orthoptera Species File lists:
 Scelimena bellula Storozhenko & Dawwrueng, 2015 - species group
 Scelimena discalis (Hancock, 1915) - species group
 Scelimena hexodon (Haan, 1843) - species group
 Scelimena novaeguineae (Bolívar, 1898)- species group
 Scelimena producta (Serville, 1838) - species group containingtype species (as Tetrix producta Serville = S. producta producta: locality Java)
 Scelimena spiculata (Stål, 1877) - species group
 Scelimena brevispina Cao & Zheng, 2011
 Scelimena chinensis (Hancock, 1915)
 Scelimena guangxiensis Zheng & Jiang, 1994
 Scelimena hafizaii Mahmood, Idris & Salmah, 2007
 Scelimena razalii Mahmood, Idris & Salmah, 2007
 Scelimena spicupennis Zheng & Ou, 2003
 Scelimena wulingshana Zheng, 1992

References

Tetrigidae
Caelifera genera